Siam Hotel may refer to:

Siam Hotel, operated by the Sukusol Group
Siam Hotels & Resorts